A bronze statue of British naval officer Horatio Nelson, 1st Viscount Nelson was installed at National Heroes Square (formerly Trafalgar Square) in Bridgetown, Barbados from 1813 to 2020. It has since been relocated to the Barbados Museum.

History 
In 1805, Nelson and the British fleet had visited Barbados while pursuing the Franco-Spanish fleet in the lead-up to the Battle of Trafalgar. A bronze statue sculpted by Richard Westmacott was erected in his honour on 22 March 1813 in what became known as Trafalgar Square, and Barbados' Parliament Buildings were constructed nearby in the late 19th century. The statue was a prominent landmark, and it was depicted on several Barbadian postage stamps issued between 1906 and 1964.

Trafalgar Square was renamed National Heroes Square in 1999. As colonial symbol, the statue became increasingly controversial and wreath-laying ceremonies on the anniversary of the Battle of Trafalgar ceased. The monument was vandalised in November 2017 on the eve of Independence Day celebrations, when blue and yellow paint was daubed on the statue and its plinth. A message describing Nelson as a "racist and white supremacist" was placed along the base.

On 24 July 2020, John King, the Minister with responsibility for Culture, announced that the statue would be removed during the national Season of Emancipation, which came to an end on 23 August. The removal was postponed in order to concentrate available funds on completing and opening a park in Saint Thomas, and eventually occurred on the International Day for Tolerance. The statue was rehoused in the Barbados Museum.

See also
List of monuments and memorials removed during the George Floyd protests

References

External links

1813 sculptures
Bronze sculptures in Barbados
Monuments and memorials in Barbados
Monuments and memorials removed during the George Floyd protests
Bridgetown
Outdoor sculptures
Sculptures by Richard Westmacott
Sculptures of men
Statues removed in 2020
Vandalized works of art